Brentwood and Ongar is a constituency in Essex represented in the House of Commons of the UK Parliament since 2017 by Alex Burghart, a Conservative, serving since October 2022 as
Parliamentary Secretary for the Cabinet Office.

History
The seat was created for the February 1974 general election, primarily from part of the abolished constituency of Billericay. It has always been a safe Conservative seat.

It was held by Eric Pickles between the General Election in 1992 and 2017 when he stood down.
The Liberal Democrats amassed their largest share of the vote in 1992 (including results for their two predecessor parties). At the 2010 election their candidate was second-placed with 13.6% of the vote, ahead of the Labour Party's candidate.

In the 2001 election, Pickles was opposed by Martin Bell, who had represented the Tatton constituency in the last Parliament as an independent and had pledged not to seek re-election there. Bell failed to gain Brentwood and Ongar from the Conservatives, but cut the Conservative majority to just 6.5%, the lowest in the seat's history.

Boundaries and boundary changes

1974–1983: The Urban District of Brentwood, and in the Rural District of Epping and Ongar the parishes of Abbess Beauchamp and Berners Roding, Blackmore, Bobbingworth, Doddinghurst, Fyfield, High Laver, High Ongar, Kelvedon Hatch, Lambourne, Little Laver, Moreton, Navestock, Ongar, Stanford Rivers, Stapleford Abbotts, Stapleford Tawney, Stondon Massey, Theydon Mount, and Willingale.

The Urban District of Brentwood was previously part of the abolished County Constituency of Billericay, and the parishes of the Rural District of Epping and Ongar (which had previously constituted the Rural District of Ongar) had been part of the abolished County Constituency of Chigwell.

1983–2010: The District of Brentwood, and the District of Epping Forest wards of Chipping Ongar, Greensted and Marden Ash, High Ongar, Lambourne, Moreton and Matching, Passingford, Roothing Country, and Shelley.

Two parishes, formerly part of the Rural District of Chelmsford and included in the District of Brentwood under the Local Government Act 1972 transferred from the County Constituency of Chelmsford. Other marginal changes.

2010–present: The Borough of Brentwood, and the District of Epping Forest wards of Chipping Ongar, Greensted and Marden Ash, High Ongar, Willingale and The Rodings, Lambourne, Moreton and Fyfield, North Weald Bassett, Passingford, and Shelley.

North Weald Bassett ward transferred from Epping Forest.  Other marginal changes due to redistribution of local authority wards.

Members of Parliament

Elections

Elections in the 2010s

Elections in the 2000s

Elections in the 1990s

Elections in the 1980s

Elections in the 1970s

Graphical representation

See also
List of parliamentary constituencies in Essex

Notes

References

External links 
nomis Constituency Profile for Brentwood and Ongar — presenting data from the ONS annual population survey and other official statistics.

Parliamentary constituencies in Essex
Constituencies of the Parliament of the United Kingdom established in 1974
Borough of Brentwood
Brentwood (Essex town)